Beezin' is the practice of applying Burt's Bees brand lip balm, often menthol or peppermint flavored, to one's eyelids. This practice, besides causing a stinging in the eyes, is purported to induce or heighten the sensation of being drunk or high, or create a state or perceived state of enhanced alertness. Some commentators have claimed that the practice is not widespread as claimed or is entirely made up, an example of a moral panic.

Dangers
Peppermint oil in the product is an eye irritant, with a potential to "develop into a full-blown inflammatory response requiring treatment." Beezin' can also cause dermatitis in skin areas around the eyes.

References

2010s fads and trends
Internet memes